Kevin Padilla (born July 7, 1964) is an American former taekwondo practitioner. He has won multiple medals in a number of tournaments. In 1989 he earned a silver in the Taekwondo World Cup.  He currently works as a coach and as a chair for the USA Team USA Taekwondo Board of Directors. He has also been a four-time U.S. National Team member, as well as a World Cup medalist and U.S. Taekwondo Union Athlete of the Year.  He also works unofficially as USA Taekwondo's chief scout.  Amongst his instructors is Marc Williams.

References

1964 births
Living people
American male taekwondo practitioners
20th-century American people